Stockport RFC was a Rugby League club in Stockport, Cheshire, England.

The club became founder members of the Northern Rugby Football Union (now Rugby Football League) after the English rugby schism, and resultant breakaway meeting at the George Hotel, Huddersfield, in 1895.

They played for eight seasons from 1895–96 to 1902–03, when they finished bottom of the newly instituted Division Two.

Like several other Cheshire clubs, they participated in the Lancashire competitions.

They had a rivalry with fellow Cheshire side Runcorn RFC.

History

Early days 

Stockport RFC — the “Clarets” — was founded 1884 by men associated with Stockport Sunday School, the largest such school in the world at the time.

The Clarets first played on a field behind their HQ - The Plough Inn, Shaw Heath and the first gate was 3sh 9d. = 19p.

On January 12, 1889, they played a friendly against the Maori touring team, attracting around 4,000 spectator’s and came away with a 3-3 draw, this was the 42nd game of the 1888/89 Maori tour and a very respectable result as the Maoris beat Ireland, Wigan, St Helens, Salford, Swansea and others quite convincingly.

They managed to attract top Lancs & Yorks clubs to the Plough ground and such was the rise in popularity that they moved in with Stockport Cricket Club at Cale Green in 1890, averaging crowds of 3,000.

Northern Union 

Before the break with Rugby Union, Stockport, like many other clubs from Lancashire and Yorkshire, had suffered punishment by the RFU for "broken time" payments. When the 22 clubs met at The George Hotel, Huddersfield, the representative of Stockport had been unable to attend the meeting personally and so had telegraphed the meeting requesting the club's admission to the new organisation. This was duly accepted.

After the Great Schism in 1895, Stockport were one of the founder members of the new league. In the first season 1895–96 the league consisted of 22 clubs and Stockport finished in 17th position.

In the second season 1896–97 the league was divided into Yorkshire and Lancashire, Stockport playing in the latter section, where they would stay for all but one of the remainder of their semi-professional existence. They finished in 5th position out of 14 teams.

In the two following seasons, still in the Lancashire section, season 1897–98 and 1898–99 they finished in 11th position out of 14 teams.

In the fifth season, 1899–1900 they improved slightly finishing 9th out of 14 teams. This was also their most successful season in the Challenge Cup, they defeated Hunslet 2-0, Tyldesley 5-2 and Radcliffe 24-3 before bowing out in the Quarter-Finals losing 0-3 to Widnes.

In 1900–01, still in the Lancashire Senior League, Stockport dropped to 12th place out the 14 teams.

In 1901–02 14 clubs broke away to form the Northern Rugby League. Stockport were not among these, and as a result of this, interest and gates dwindled, so together with the remaining clubs and several additions from the lower county leagues, continued in the Lancashire Senior league, which became in effect division 2 (West). A slightly better season saw a mid-table finish in 6th place out of the 13 clubs. 

At the end of the 1901–02 season, the County Leagues elected 18 teams to join the new Division 2 (7 from Lancashire and 10 from Yorkshire and new member South Shields) with the existing second competition scrapped. 

In 1902–03 Stockport were elected into the new 2nd Division losing many of their top pro players, In this, their eighth and last season among the semi-professional clubs, Stockport finished 18th out of 18 clubs, bottom of the league with only 11 points, whereas Morecambe, the second bottom, had 20 points.

In May 1903, the town’s rugby and football clubs met and it was suggested that the rugby club should disband. Nothing was decided but the debate lingered and the Yorkshire Post of 16 July 1903 reported: “Certain conditions have been drawn up in connection with the proposed transfer of the ground to the Association club and it is understood they will be in all probability accepted. The opinion prevails that the Rugby Club will shortly disband.”

At a meeting on Saturday 15 August 1903, the end was confirmed and Stockport County F.C took over liabilities that amounted to around £350 owing to a well-known gentleman [Mr Sykes] in the town. The rugby club, it was reported, had been sorely tried by the rapid strides made by the association game in Stockport and had fallen deeper into debt. The last Captain, Yorkshireman William Robinson, took a tobacconist’s shop on Castle street, Edgeley.

"(Stockport) County gained admission to the Second Division of the Football League in 1900, and following this elevation - and consequent requirement for a larger ground - the club moved to its current home of Edgeley Park in 1902, which was then the home of Stockport Rugby League Club. 
The rugby club folded a few years later, leaving County as sole tenants."

Stadium
Stockport RFC first played on a field behind their Headquarters - The Plough Inn, Shaw Heath. The cost of entry to the first gate was 3sh 9d. = 19p.

In 1890 they moved in with Stockport Cricket Club at Beech road, Cale Green.

In 1891 they moved into the newly built Edgeley Park, the land the stadium was built on was donated to the club by the Sykes Family, Owner’s of Sykes Bleaching Company

Records

Club scoring record

Club records
Best League performance: 5th(out of 14 clubs) 1896/97 Northern Rugby Football Union(Lancs Senior)

Best Challenge cup performance: Quarter-Final 1899/1900
Highest attendance: Approximately 10,000(at Plough ground) 1895/96 Northern Rugby Football Union

Club league record 

Heading Abbreviations
Pl = Games played; W = Win; D = Draw; L = Lose; PF = Points for; PA = Points against; Diff = Points difference (+ or -); Pts = League Points 
League points: for win = 2; for draw = 1; for loss = 0.

Several fixtures and results 
The following are just a few of Stockport's fixtures from the eight seasons in which they played (semi) professional Rugby League :-
 
 
 
 

Heading Abbreviations
CC Rx = Challenge Cup Round x; LC Rx = Lancahire Cup Competition; JPT Rx = John Player Trophy; REGAL Rx = Regal Trophy.

Notes and comments 
1 - Folly Fields is the stadium used by Wigan at the time until 1901. They then became sub-tenants of Springfield Park See below - Note 3.

2 - Lowerhouse Lane is the original site of the current ground used by Widnes. It was renamed Naughton Park in 1932 in honour of club secretary, Tom Naughton - and later renamed Halton Stadium after being completely rebuilt in 1997.

3 - Wigan became sub-tenants of Springfield Park, which they shared with Wigan United AFC, playing their first game there on 14 September 1901 at which a crowd of 4,000 saw them beat Morecambe 12–0, and the last game on 28 April 1902 when Wigan beat the Rest of Lancashire Senior Competition. A temporary ground was necessary to span the period between moving from Folly Fields and the new ground at Central Park being constructed.

See also 
1897 Challenge Cup
Rugby Football League
1895–96 Northern Rugby Football Union season
1896–97 Northern Rugby Football Union season
1897–98 Northern Rugby Football Union season
1898–99 Northern Rugby Football Union season
1899–1900 Northern Rugby Football Union season
1900–01 Northern Rugby Football Union season
1901–02 Northern Rugby Football Union season
1902–03 Northern Rugby Football Union season
British rugby league system
The Great Schism – Rugby League View
The Great Schism – Rugby Union View
Rugby league county leagues
List of defunct rugby league clubs
Stockport - sport

References

External links 
1896–97 Northern Rugby Football Union season at wigan.rlfans.com
Hull&Proud Fixtures & Results 1896/1897
Widnes Vikings - One team, one passion Season In Review - 1896–97
Saints Heritage Society
Warington History
About Stockport County
Stockport County History
100 Years of Rugby - The History of Wakefield Trinity Football Club 1873–1973 by C Lindley with personal recollections by D W Armitage

Defunct rugby league teams in England
Rugby league teams in Cheshire
Sport in Stockport
Rugby clubs established in 1895
Founder members of the Northern Rugby Football Union
Rugby league teams in Greater Manchester
1895 establishments in England